In mathematics, the inflation-restriction exact sequence is an exact sequence occurring in group cohomology and is a special case of the five-term exact sequence arising from the study of spectral sequences.

Specifically, let G be a group, N a normal subgroup, and A an abelian group which is equipped with an action of G, i.e., a homomorphism from G to the automorphism group of A. The quotient group G/N acts on 
AN = { a ∈ A : na = a for all n ∈ N}.
 
Then the inflation-restriction exact sequence is:

0 → H 1(G/N, AN) → H 1(G, A) → H 1(N, A)G/N → H 2(G/N, AN) →H 2(G, A)

In this sequence, there are maps
 inflation H 1(G/N, AN) → H 1(G, A)
 restriction H 1(G, A) → H 1(N, A)G/N
 transgression H 1(N, A)G/N → H 2(G/N, AN)
 inflation H 2(G/N, AN) →H 2(G, A)

The inflation and restriction are defined for general n:
 inflation Hn(G/N, AN) → Hn(G, A)
 restriction Hn(G, A) → Hn(N, A)G/N

The transgression is defined for general n 
 transgression Hn(N, A)G/N → Hn+1(G/N, AN)
only if Hi(N, A)G/N = 0 for i ≤ n − 1.

The sequence for general n may be deduced from the case n = 1 by dimension-shifting or from the Lyndon–Hochschild–Serre spectral sequence.

References

 
 
  
 
 
 

Homological algebra